The Hong Kong Film Awards statue is a  bronze sculpture depicting the Hong Kong Film Award statuette presented to recipients, installed along Hong Kong's Avenue of Stars, in Tsim Sha Tsui's waterfront in Kowloon. The statue has been relocated to the Tsim Sha Tsui East Waterfront Podium Garden temporarily, during an ongoing waterfront revitalisation project.

References

External links

 

Bronze sculptures in Hong Kong
Hong Kong Film Awards
Outdoor sculptures in Hong Kong
Sculptures of women in Hong Kong
Statues in Hong Kong
Tsim Sha Tsui